Nerissa is a feminine given name, and may refer to:
 Nerissa Bowes-Lyon (1919–1986),  cousin of Queen Elizabeth II, who appeared in the Channel 4 documentary "The Queen's Hidden Cousins"
 Nerissa Bretania Underwood (born 1955) Guamanian politician
 Nerissa Brockenburr Stickney (1913–1960), American pianist
 Nerissa Corazon Soon-Ruiz (born 1956), Filipino politician
 Nerissa Nields, American rock and folk musician
 Thea Nerissa Barnes (1952–2018), American professional dancer

Fictional characters 
 a character from William Shakespeare's play The Merchant of Venice
 Nerissa (W.I.T.C.H.), an antagonist in the comic book and TV series W.I.T.C.H.
 Queen Narissa, the arch-villain from the 2007 Disney film Enchanted

Feminine given names